The Unarchiver is a proprietary freeware data decompression utility, which supports more formats than Archive Utility (formerly known as BOMArchiveHelper), the built-in archive unpacker program in macOS. It can also handle filenames in various character encodings, created using operating system versions that use those character encodings. The latest version requires Mac OS X Lion or higher. The Unarchiver does not compress files.

The corresponding command line utilities unar and lsar is free software licensed under the LGPL run on Microsoft Windows, Linux, and macOS.

A main feature of the Unarchiver is its ability to handle many old or obscure formats like StuffIt as well as AmigaOS disk images and LZH / LZX archives, and so on. This is credited in its source code to the use of libxad, an Amiga file format library. Ågren also worked to reverse engineer the StuffIt and StuffIt X formats, and his code was one of the most complete open source implementations of these proprietary formats.

References

External links

 The Unarchiver's Website
 unar, lsar source code repository
 Circlesoft Website
 Version for Mac OS X 10.6.8 and earlier
 Old Source Code as ZIP

File archivers
Data compression software
macOS software